Kipat Barzel (Iron Dome) is an Israeli television drama series aired in 2017, focusing on the lives of Haredi Jewish military recruits. The show has run for two seasons and includes 16 episodes.

See also 
 Shababnikim (2017)

References 

Films about Orthodox and Hasidic Jews
Television series about Jews and Judaism
Israeli drama television series
Religion in the Israel Defense Forces
Films about the Israel Defense Forces
Israeli military television series